David Batanero Puigbó (born 27 September 1988) is a Spanish footballer who plays as a midfielder.

Club career
Born in Barcelona, Catalonia, Batanero finished his formation with CF Damm. In 2007 he moved to RCD Espanyol, being initially assigned to the reserves in Segunda División B; however, he failed to make an appearance for the club, and subsequently served loan stints at Tercera División sides CD Blanes and CF Igualada.

After cutting ties with the Pericos, Batanero signed for Torrellano Illice CF also in the fourth division. After featuring rarely, he moved to UDA Gramenet's B-side in January 2010.

For the 2010–11 campaign, Batanero represented his first club CE Sallent in the regional leagues. After a one-season spell at UE Rubí, he joined Palamós CF in July 2012.

Batanero was released by Palamós on 17 April 2013, and returned to Sallent two days later. On 14 June, he agreed to a two-year contract with Terrassa FC in the fourth division.

On 1 July 2015, Batanero moved to Segunda División B after signing a one-year contract with CE Sabadell FC. The following 20 June, his contract was automatically renewed for a further campaign, but he suffered a knee injury which kept him out of the first half of the season.

On 29 March 2017, after not being registered with the first team, Batanero cut ties with the Arquelinats. The following day, he moved abroad for the first time in his career after agreeing to a two-year deal with Swedish club GIF Sundsvall.

Batanero made his professional debut on 22 July 2017, starting in a 2–2 away draw against Halmstads BK for the Allsvenskan championship.

References

External links

1988 births
Living people
Footballers from Barcelona
Spanish footballers
Association football midfielders
RCD Espanyol footballers
CE Manresa players
UE Rubí players
Palamós CF footballers
Terrassa FC footballers
CE Sabadell FC footballers
GIF Sundsvall players
CF Damm players
Mjällby AIF players
UD Ibiza players
Segunda División B players
Tercera División players
Allsvenskan players
Spanish expatriate footballers
Spanish expatriate sportspeople in Sweden
Expatriate footballers in Sweden